Cwmtwrch is a village in the valley of the Afon Twrch, a right-bank tributary to the Swansea Valley, Wales, some 15 miles north of Swansea. It is also the name of an electoral ward to Powys County Council.

Actors Craig Russell, Richard Corgan and Steven Meo all come from the village.

The Sci Fi comedy horror film Canaries is set and was filmed in Cwmtwrch.

History and origins

The name Cwmtwrch (meaning Valley of the wild boar) derives from the "Twrch Trwyth",  a mythical wild boar of King Arthur's legends and the ancient Welsh folklore tales of the Mabinogion in early Welsh literature.

The legend relates to one of Arthur's tasks: to rid the western Brecon Beacons of the pack of wild boars that were terrorizing the people. Arthur chased the boars from Dyfed eastward towards Powys. On the Black Mountain, he picked up a large stone (the carreg fryn fras) and cast it towards the wild animals, striking dead the leader of the pack on the edge of a valley near Craig-y-Fran Gorge. The big boar's body rolled down the valley and into the river which is now the Afon Twrch. The big stone is still on the mountain.

The early history of Cwmtwrch is found in the records of the Manor of Palleg. This small estate was owned by the Aubrey family in the early 16th century. In 1595 was said tO include 20 farms scattered around the high ground to the north of the Twrch river. There was also a corn milL, Felin Palleg, close to the river.

The manor passed to the Morgan family of Tredegar House, Newport South Wales, by the late 18th century. They employed a gamekeeper to look after the estate. Local woodland would have been a source of charcoal for the early iron furnace at Ynyscedwyn from the 17th century onwards. The best of the mature hardwood trees from the area were felled and sold off during the early 19th century.

The now vanished Tir-y-gof Farm was used by drovers as a base where their cattle were shod on their long journeys to market. Alongside the industrial workers there were tailors, shoemakers and blacksmiths, publicans and shopkeepers. There were also numerous chapels in the village, namely Bethania Chapel (1851), Bethel Chapel (1861), Beulah Chapel (1893) and Capel Newydd (1930).

Ebeneser Rees (1848-1908), the founder of the "Llais Llafur" newspaper was raised in Cwmtwrch and is buried in the Beulah Chapel Cemetery, Palleg.

Cwmtwrch has been split into two parts, Upper Cwmtwrch (Cwm Twrch Uchaf) and Lower Cwmtwrch (Cwm Twrch Isaf), due to the traversing of the now defunct railway line and road at two points requiring an upper and lower gate.

Nearby is the town of Ystradgynlais and villages of Ystradowen, Rhiwfawr and Ystalyfera.

Governance
Cwm-twrch is the name of the electoral ward which covers the western quarter of the Ystradgynlais community and includes Cwmtwrch Isaf and Cwmtwrch Uchaf to the south. In 2004 a slice of the neighbouring Neath Port Talbot ward of Ystalyfera, bordering Cwmtwrch Isaf, was transferred to the Cwm-twrch ward. The ward elects one county councillor to Powys County Council.

A Cwmtwrch & Gurnos ward is represented by up to four town councillors on Ystradgynlais Town Council.

Sport

Cwmtwrch is home to the rugby union team Cwmtwrch RFC a Welsh Rugby Union affiliated club with over a hundred years of history. A resident is Clive Rowlands, former Wales national rugby union team captain, who also managed both the national team and the British Lions.

The village football team, Cwmtwrch Wanderers AFC, is long established and successful having won the Neath Premier division on 16 occasions. They have also won 15 cups to make them the most successful team in the league's history.

Golf is played at Palleg Golf Club which is located in Lower Cwmtwrch. A mountain course, it was extended to eighteen holes through lottery funding.

References

External links
 – Upper Cwmtwrch
 – Lower Cwmtwrch

Villages in Powys
Wards of Powys
Swansea Valley